Echinosphaerites is a genus of rhombiferan cystoid echinoderms that lived in the Early to Middle Ordovician of North America and Europe (Bockelie, 1981).

Biology 
Echinosphaerites had branched biserial brachioles which is rare for species belonging to the Class Rhombifera. Echinosphaerites had a skeletal meshwork like many other blastozoan echinoderms, with a fine outer mesh layer and an inner coarse mesh layer. During evolution the number and location of these brachioles, including the branching patterns, increased in the number of brachioles and complexity of the branching pattern. The exothecal pore structures increased in the complexity of patterns of tangential canals (Bockelie, 1981).

References 
 Bockelie, J.F., 1981. Functional morphology and evolution of the cystoid Echinosphaerites. Lethaia 14: 189–202.

External links
Echinosphaerites in the Paleobiology Database
Functional morphology and evolution of the cystoid Echinosphaerites in the Wiley Online Library

Cystoidea
Blastozoa genera
Ordovician echinoderms of Europe
Fossils of the Czech Republic
Letná Formation
Ordovician echinoderms of North America
Early Ordovician first appearances
Middle Ordovician extinctions